Mark Andrew Mayerhofler (born 8 October 1972) is a former rugby union player who represented the New Zealand All Blacks six times in 1998. In 1997 he won the Tom French Cup, an honour awarded annually by New Zealand Rugby Union (NZRU) to the Maori player of the year.  He also played for Newcastle Falcons in the Guinness Premiership. Whilst at Newcastle he started as they won the 2004 Powergen Cup final.

He attended Henderson High School, Auckland New Zealand.

Mayerhofler's position of choice was as a 2nd 5/8

References

External links

Newcastle Falcons profile

1972 births
Living people
New Zealand international rugby union players
New Zealand rugby union players
Crusaders (rugby union) players
Canterbury rugby union players
Blues (Super Rugby) players
Rugby union centres
Newcastle Falcons players
New Zealand Māori sportspeople
Rugby union players from Auckland